Mary L. Kraft is a professor at the department of chemical and biological engineering at the University of Illinois. 

Kraft's r research focuses on analyzing the structure and function of cells using computational statistics and imaging techniques. She won the Walter A. Shaw Young Investigator Award in Lipid Research in 2014 and has authored over 90 papers.

References

External links

Living people
University of Illinois faculty
Year of birth missing (living people)
Place of birth missing (living people)
American chemical engineers
Women chemical engineers
American biophysicists
Women biophysicists